The Pale Dreamer is a 2016 supernatural dystopian novella by British writer Samantha Shannon, the prequel of The Bone Season series.

Plot 
Plot Summary

In Scion London in the year 2056, dreamwalker Paige Mahoney has been recruited by Jaxon Hall, The White Binder, Mime-Lord of The Seven Seals, a criminal clairvoyant organisation operating covertly in London, I Cohort, Section 4. 

Paige goes on her first job to prove herself to Jaxon and the Seals by capturing Anne Naylor, a poltergeist, and her murderer, sought after poltergeist Sarah Metyard. Paige works on honing her dreamwalking gift and earns her place as Jaxon's mollisher, the second in charge of the Seals, and takes on a new identity as the Pale Dreamer. 

Main Characters 

 Paige Eva Mahoney (born Paige Aoife Mahoney), The Pale Dreamer, is Mollisher of The Seven Seals and a Dreamwalker of the VII Order of Clairvoyance, Jumpers, which are identified by a red aura. 
 Jaxon Hall, The White Binder, is Mime-Lord of The Seven Seals. Jaxon is a Binder, a Guardian of the V Order of Clairvoyance which are identified by an orange aura. 
 Nicklas 'Nick' Rygard, The Red Vision, is a member of The Seven Seals and an Oracle of the VII Order of Clairvoyance, Jumpers, which are identified by a red aura. 
 Eliza Renton, The Martyred Muse, is a member of the Seven Seals and an automatise (art medium) of the III Order of Clairvoyance, Mediums, which are identified by a green aura.
 Sarah 'Sally' Metyard, poltergeist, daughter of Sarah Metyard, sentenced to death for the murder of Anne Naylor.
 Anne 'Nanny' Naylor, poltergeist, murdered by Sarah and Sally Metyard.

Development 
The Pale Dreamer is loosely based on the true story of the neglect and murder of Anne 'Nanny' Naylor by mother and daughter Sarah Metyard and Sarah 'Sally' Metyard in the 1750s. According to official records, Anne was beaten and starved by the Metyards after attempting to escape. Her sister was also murdered by the Metyards. Both Metyards were executed by hanging at Surgeon's Hall. Countless real reports exist of "a girl’s screams being heard in Farringdon Station since 1758", according to My London's Erica Buist.

Reception 
The Daily Telegraph's Helen Brown described The Pale Dreamer as "A clever and courageous character, reminiscent of Katniss Everdeen from The Hunger Games". The Bone Season series is an international bestseller, with author Samantha Shannon being compared with JK Rowling. The Pale Dreamer "more than sustains Shannon’s usual standard", according to Girl with her Head in a Book.

External links

References 

2016 novels